Gustaf Albert Ahlbert (26 January 1884 – 1943) was a Swedish missionary and linguist. He served with the Mission Union of Sweden in Chinese Turkestan (present day Xinjiang).

Ahlbert had a competent knowledge of Hebrew, Greek, Arabic and Uyghur.

He was one of the last three missionaries to be expelled from Kashgar in 1939. After he was expelled, he worked among Muslims in India, and worked together with Oskar Hermansson and Dr. Nur Luke on the Uyghur Bible translation, until his death in Bombay in 1943.

References

Bibliography
Gustaf Ahlbert, Bachta Chan eller Lyckobarnet, Stockholm, 1934 
Gustaf Ahlbert, Habil: En Kristen Martyr i Östturkestan, Stockholm,. (1934)
Gustaf Ahlbert, Letter specimens. The manner of writing letters and documents in the six cities, Kashghar: Svenska Missionstryckeriet (1920)
Gustaf Ahlbert, Spelling-book for the language of the Six Cities, Kashghar: Swedish Mission Press, (1929)
Gustaf Ahlbert, östtur-kestansk flickas historia
John Hultvall, Mission och revolution i Centralasien: Svenska Missionsförbundets mission i Östturkestan 1892 - 1938, Stockholm: Gummesson 1981.
Rachel O. Wingate, The Steep Ascent: The Story of the Christian Church in Turkestan, British and Foreign Bible Society (1948?)

See also
Mission and Change in Eastern Turkestan (English Translation of select chapters of Mission och revolution i Centralasien)

Swedish Protestant missionaries
Protestant missionaries in China
1884 births
1943 deaths
Translators of the Bible into Uyghur
Christian missionaries in Central Asia
Swedish expatriates in China
20th-century translators
Missionary linguists